Campbell Bascom Slemp (September 4, 1870 – August 7, 1943) was an American Republican politician. He was a six-time United States congressman from Virginia's 9th congressional district from 1907 to 1923 and served as the presidential secretary to President Calvin Coolidge. As a philanthropist, Slemp set up the "Slemp Foundation", which provides gifts and scholarships to schools and colleges in Southwestern Virginia.

Early and family life
Slemp was born on September 4, 1870, at Turkey Cove, Virginia, in Lee County to Colonel Campbell Slemp, who later became a United States Representative from the 9th district of Virginia (1903 to 1907). His mother was Nancy (Nannie) Britain Cawood of Harlan County, Kentucky.  His father was an officer in the Confederate army during the American Civil War.  Bascom Slemp had one brother who survived infancy, William Moses Slemp (1873–1912) and three sisters: Emma M. Slemp (1865–1889), Susan Jane Slemp Newman (1869-1935), and Laura Alpha Drucilla Slemp  Habourn (1877–1900).

Slemp attended the Methodist-run "Seminary" in Turkey Cove, and had a private tutor (William Davidson of King College), and also at age 9 became a page in the Virginia House of Delegates after his father's election to the Virginia General Assembly in 1879. In 1887, the 16-year-old Slemp entered the Corps of Cadets at Virginia Military Institute in Lexington, Virginia. In 1891, he graduated with the highest grade point average in the school's history — a record that stands today. He also received the Jackson Medal for Most Distinguished Student four years in a row.

Bascom Slemp then studied law for a year at the University of Virginia in Charlottesville and was admitted to the Virginia bar in 1901.

He briefly married Roberta Trousdale Barton (1891–1911) in New Orleans, Louisiana, on December 26, 1911, but their daughter was stillborn the following year.

Early career
Slemp served as Commandant of Cadets at the Marion Military Institute for one year, after which he was hired as the second principal of the Stonega Academy in Big Stone Gap (1893–1895). Slemp then taught at VMI as professor of mathematics for several years. In 1901, after being admitted to the Virginia bar, he resigned his position at the institute to set up a law practice in Big Stone Gap. Slemp became president of the Slemp Coal Company and of the Hamilton Realty Company, among other business interests.

Political career

His father Campbell Slemp served in the United States House of Representatives from 1903 to 1907, controlling patronage in the state as well as representing Virginia's 9th congressional district until his unexpected death in October 1907. In 1905, Bascom Slemp became chairman of Virginia's Republican State Committee, where he served until 1918, at which point he was elected to the Republican National Committee.

Bascom Slemp won the special election to fill his father's vacancy, and also won reelection six times, serving from 1907 until March 3, 1923, after he declined to be a candidate for re-election. As the leading Republican in the Old Dominion, he faced a difficult battle for re-election in 1910, after Democrats persuaded Henry C. Stuart to run against him, and used the slogan "Redeem the District." Theodore Roosevelt gave a speech for Slemp, who won by a margin of about 200 votes. Although Stuart initially refused to concede defeat, his contest failed, in part because all 265 precincts had a Democratic registrar, two Democratic clerks and at least two Democratic judges.

On September 4, 1923, six months after Slemp completed his last term as Congressman, President Calvin Coolidge appointed him to serve as his secretary, a post similar to the later White House Chief of Staff. The appointment of Slemp to this prominent position stirred anger among African Americans within the Republican party. Black newspapers of the time decried Slemp's leadership of the "lily white movement" to oust black leaders from Virginia's Republican party. During his time in Congress, Slemp was one of only a small handful of Republicans who voted against the Dyer Anti-Lynching bill of 1922. An article in the nationally syndicated Pittsburgh Courier reported that "The Associated Negro Press has been informed from a number of sources that Slemp is a member of the Ku Klux Klan and a strong sympathizer with that nefarious organization."

Slemp served until March 4, 1925. He resigned early in Coolidge's second term as a result of unresolved friction with the President, and he was succeeded by Everett Sanders.

Return to rural life
After leaving the Coolidge administration, Slemp returned to his law practice in Big Stone Gap, Virginia, and Washington, D.C. In 1930, President Herbert Hoover appointed Slemp as United States Commissioner General to the International Colonial and Overseas Exposition in Paris, and at its conclusion in 1931, France awarded Slemp the French Legion of Honor Medal. By the 1930 Census, Slemp lived in Big Stone Gap with his sister S. Janie and her husband John W. Newman and several servants. With Janie's help, Slemp established the Southwest Virginia Museum, and after his death, the Commonwealth accepted many pieces bequeathed to it.

Death and legacy
Slemp often maintained a local residence with siblings, and remained a prominent member of the southwest Virginia community and political scene until his death. He died at St. Mary's hospital in Knoxville, Tennessee, on August 7, 1943, aged 73, of long-standing heart disease, He was later buried in the family cemetery at Turkey Cove.

As a philanthropist, Slemp continues to touch many young lives through the Slemp Foundation, established in his will and which provides gifts to libraries, schools and colleges in Southwestern Virginia. The "Lonesome Pine Regional Library" (which serves Lee, Dickenson, and Wise Counties, Virginia) has received support from the foundation, and its branch in Big Stone Gap is named in Slemp's honor.

The Slemp Scholarship, named in honor of the late congressman, is awarded to outstanding college students who graduated from schools in Lee, Scott, and Wise Counties, Virginia.

In October 2003, the long-planned C. Bascom Slemp Student Center was opened on the campus of the University of Virginia's College at Wise. This $10.9 million,  structure was funded by student fees as well as $2.5 million from the Slemp Foundation.

Slemp was a cousin three times removed of the American film star George C. Scott.

The Slemp family remained active in political life throughout Southwestern Virginia. Current Slemp family members elected to office include Lee County, Virginia Board of Supervisors member Charles Herbert Slemp, Jr. and Commonwealth's Attorney for Wise County & the City of Norton, Virginia, Charles Herbert "Chuck" Slemp, III.

The United States Post Office and Courthouse at Big Stone Gap, Virginia, is named the C. Bascom Slemp Federal Building. A historical marker in Seminary, Virginia, about 6 miles southwest of Big Stone Gap on Alt. Route 58, also honors three Congressmen born within a mile of the marker: Slemp (61st-67th Congresses), his father Campbell Slemp (58th through 60th Congresses) and Congressman James B. Richmond (46th Congress).

See also
Guy B. Haroth, The Political Career of C. Bascom Slemp, (Duke University PhD Dissertation 1950)

Slemp, Campbell Bascom (ed.) Addresses of Famous Southwest Virginians (Bristol: The King Printing Company 1939)

References

External links
 

1870 births
1943 deaths
People from Lee County, Virginia
Commandants of Marion Military Institute
Secretaries
Personal secretaries to the President of the United States
American philanthropists
American people of German descent
Virginia lawyers
Virginia Military Institute alumni
University of Virginia School of Law alumni
Virginia Military Institute faculty
People from Big Stone Gap, Virginia
Republican Party members of the United States House of Representatives from Virginia